Scott Joseph Wiggins (born March 24, 1976) is a former pitcher in Major League Baseball.

Wiggins appeared in three games as a reliever for the Blue Jays as a September call-up in 2002, recording a 0-0 record with a 3.38 ERA in 2.2 innings pitched with three strikeouts.

In 10 minor league and Independent League seasons, Wiggins posted a 31-24 won-loss record with a 3.60 ERA in 595.1 innings pitched with 561 strikeouts.

External links

1976 births
Living people
American expatriate baseball players in Canada
Major League Baseball pitchers
Toronto Blue Jays players
Somerset Patriots players
Baseball players from Kentucky
Trenton Thunder players
Northern Kentucky Norse baseball players